Montitega is a genus of flowering plants belonging to the family Ericaceae.

Habitat 
From sea level to alpine zones on poorly drained ground or peat bogs amongst other cushion-plants, shrubs and grasses. In northern part of its range this species is strictly alpine

Distribution 
Indigenous. Australia (Tasmania) and New Zealand (North, South and Stewart Islands)

Flowering 

 Flowering time: January - March
 Flowering color: white
 Fruiting: January - April

Species:
 Montitega dealbata (R.Br.) C.M.Weiller

References

Epacridoideae
Ericaceae genera